Bey Soo Khiang (born 10 August 1955) is a Singaporean former lieutenant-general who served as Chief of Defence Force between 1995 and 2000, and Chief of Air Force between 1992 and 1995. He was also the first chief of Defence Force to be from the Air Force.

Education
Bey was awarded the Singapore Armed Forces Overseas Scholarship in 1974. He holds Bachelor of Arts and Master of Arts degrees in engineering from the University of Cambridge. He also completed a Master of Public Administration degree at the John F. Kennedy School of Government at Harvard University, and attended the six-week Advanced Management Program at Harvard Business School.

Military career
Bey enlisted in the Singapore Armed Forces (SAF) in 1973 and served as the Chief of Air Force before assuming the post of Chief of Defence Force (CDF) on 1 July 1995, replacing Ng Jui Ping. While serving as the Chief of Defence Force, he was also appointed as a member of the board of directors for Singapore Technologies Engineering and Singapore Airlines Limited.

Bey retired from the SAF on 1 April 2000 and was succeeded by Lim Chuan Poh as the CDF.

Post-military career
After leaving the SAF in 2000, Bey joined Singapore Airlines (SIA) as Executive Vice President (Technical) and was promoted to Senior EVP (Technical & Human Resources) two years later. During his time in SIA, he led the project to introduce the Airbus A380 into SIA and also served in the following positions: Chairman of SIA Cargo Pte Ltd; Chairman of Silkair Pte Ltd; Chairman of Singapore Flying College; Board Director of SIA Engineering Company; Virgin Atlantic Limited; Virgin Atlantic Airways Limited; Virgin Travel Group Limited. He is also an active board member in the Sentosa Development Corporation. In early 2010, he assumed the post of Senior Executive Vice President for Marketing & Corporate Services. Bey left SIA on 28 February 2011.

Bey was appointed as the Vice-Chairman of RGE Pte Ltd in March 2011.

References

|-

|-

Living people
Singaporean businesspeople
Singaporean people of Chinese descent
Chief of the Republic of Singapore Air Force
Harvard Kennedy School alumni
Alumni of the University of Cambridge
Chiefs of Defence Force (Singapore)
1955 births